West Hampstead railway station is a London Overground station on the North London Line between  and  in the London Borough of Camden and is in Travelcard Zone 2.

The station and all trains are operated by London Overground.

History
The station opened on 1 March 1888 and was called West End Lane until 1975, when it became West Hampstead (making it one of three stations of essentially the same name along West End Lane). The train service was provided by the North London Railway until 1909, when management of the NLR was taken over by the London and North Western Railway. Complete amalgamation with the LNWR followed in 1922, and the LNWR then amalgamated with other railways to form the LMS from January 1923. The LMS became the London Midland Region of British Railways on nationalisation in 1948, and the shortened brand name British Rail was used from 1965. The station and the rest of the North London Line was included in the reorganised BR business Network SouthEast in 1986.

Following the privatisation of British Rail, the station was managed by the Silverlink franchise (National Express) from 1997 until 2007, when operations passed to Transport for London's new London Overground.

This service, known as London Crosslink, was discontinued in Autumn 2002 because of a shortage of train paths on the North London Line and the financial return being less than forecast.

The station was initially refurbished towards the end of 2007, to coincide with the takeover of the line by London Overground.

The station was comprehensively upgraded in the late 2010s thanks in part to the adjacent Ballymore West Hampstead Square development. The upgrade included a new station building, wider platforms and step free access, and was completed in December 2019.

Accidents and incidents
On 23 February 1937, an express freight train was derailed near the station.

Interchanges

West Hampstead railway station has an out of station interchange with both West Hampstead Thameslink railway station and West Hampstead Underground station. The arrangement of three separate stations (Thameslink, Overground and Jubilee Line) means that passengers wishing to change lines must walk along or cross West End Lane, a busy main road.

Development
A West Hampstead interchange proposal was put forward in 2004 by Chiltern Railways which would link the three West Hampstead stations with subterranean walkways. New platforms would be built for the Chiltern Main Line, and possibly also for the Metropolitan line, and the Thameslink and London Overground (formerly Silverlink) stations would be relocated on the east side of West End Lane.
The redevelopment would involve demolishing existing buildings and the redevelopment of West End Lane as "a tree-lined boulevard". The plans were put on hold in 2007 due to uncertainty over the North London Line rail franchise. This has now been shelved with Network Rail instead redeveloping the Thameslink station by installing a second footbridge with lift access leading to a new station building on Iverson Road.

In early 2008, the London Group of the Campaign for Better Transport published a plan for an off-road, mainly orbital North and West London Light Railway, sharing the orbital Dudding Hill Line freight corridor, and taking over at least one of the two Midland Railway freight lines which run through the neighbouring West Hampstead Thameslink station.

Connections
London Buses routes 139, 328 and C11 serve the station.

Services
West Hampstead currently has the following London Overground (North London Line) services, which is operated by Class 378 trainsets.

Off-peak:

6tph to Stratford
4tph to Richmond
2tph to Clapham Junction

References

Railway stations in the London Borough of Camden
Former London and North Western Railway stations
Railway stations in Great Britain opened in 1888
Railway stations served by London Overground